Li Changyu (born 19 July 1983) is a Chinese former speed skater. He competed in the men's 1500 metres event at the 2006 Winter Olympics. He retired in 2009.

References

1983 births
Living people
Chinese male speed skaters
Olympic speed skaters of China
Speed skaters at the 2006 Winter Olympics
Place of birth missing (living people)